Gouinia is a genus of Latin American plants in the grass family.

 Species
 Gouinia barbata (Hack.) Swallen - Pernambuco, Paraíba, Rio Grande do Norte
 Gouinia brasiliensis (S.Moore) Swallen - Brazil (Mato Grosso, Mato Grosso do Sul), Bolivia, Paraguay, Argentina (Salta, Chaco)
 Gouinia cearensis (Ekman) Swallen - Ceará, Pernambuco
 Gouinia gracilis Ekman - Cuba
 Gouinia guatemalensis (Hack.) Swallen - Nicaragua, Honduras, Guatemala, Chiapas, Campeche, Yucatán, Oaxaca
 Gouinia isabelensis J.J.Ortíz - Nayarit
 Gouinia latifolia (Griseb.) Vasey - widespread from Oaxaca to Paraguay
 Gouinia mexicana (Scribn.) Vasey - Querétaro, San Luis Potosí
 Gouinia papillosa Swallen - Yucatán Peninsula, Tamaulipas
 Gouinia paraguayensis (Kuntze) Parodi - Argentina, Paraguay, Bolivia, Peru
 Gouinia tortuosa Swallen - Argentina, Paraguay, Bolivia
 Gouinia virgata (J.Presl) Scribn. - Mexico, Central America, Cuba, Hispaniola, Colombia, Ecuador, Peru

 formerly included
see Enteropogon 
 Gouinia brandegeei - Enteropogon brandegeei

References

Chloridoideae
Poaceae genera
Grasses of North America
Grasses of South America
Flora of Central America
Grasses of Brazil
Grasses of Mexico